The Royal College of Physicians (RCP) is a British professional membership body dedicated to improving the practice of medicine, chiefly through the accreditation of physicians by examination. Founded by royal charter from King Henry VIII in 1518, as the College of Physicians, the RCP is the oldest medical college in England. It set the first international standard in the classification of diseases, and its library contains medical texts of great historical interest. The college is sometimes referred to as the Royal College of Physicians of London to differentiate it from other similarly named bodies.

The RCP drives improvements in health and healthcare through advocacy, education and research. Its 40,000 members work in hospitals and communities across over 30 medical specialties with around a fifth based in over 80 countries worldwide.

The college hosts six training faculties: the Faculty of Forensic and Legal Medicine, the Faculty for Pharmaceutical Medicine, the Faculty of Occupational Medicine the Faculty of Public Health, the Faculty of Sport and Exercise Medicine and the Faculty of Physician Associates.

The RCP's home in Regent's Park is one of the few post-war buildings to be granted Grade I listed status. In 2016 it was announced that the RCP was to open a  new home in the north of England at The Spine, a new building in the Liverpool Knowledge Quarter in Liverpool. The Spine opened in May 2021.

History

A small group of distinguished physicians, led by the scholar, humanist and priest Thomas Linacre, petitioned King Henry VIII to be incorporated into a College similar to those found in a number of other European countries. The main functions of the college, as set down in the founding Charter, were to grant licences to those qualified to practise and to punish unqualified practitioners and those engaging in malpractice. This included apothecaries as well as physicians.

It was founded as the College of Physicians when it received a royal charter in 1518, affirmed by Act of Parliament in 1523. It is not known when the name "Royal College" was first assumed or granted. It came into use after the charter of 1663. It was legally confirmed in 1960 by the Royal College of Physicians of London Act (which was primarily required in order to move the premises of the college outside of the Cities of London or Westminster to Regent's Park).

The college has been continuously active in improving the practice of medicine since its foundation, primarily though the accreditation of physicians. It is a member of the UK Academy of Medical Royal Colleges. It is sometimes referred to as the Royal College of Physicians of London to differentiate it from other similarly named bodies. It was the first College of Physicians in Britain or Ireland. Its establishment followed the incorporation of the Barber-Surgeons of Dublin in 1446 (by royal decree of Henry VI of England as Lord of Ireland), which was the first medical corporation in Ireland or Britain; the Barber-Surgeons of Edinburgh were incorporated by the City of Edinburgh in 1505.

The college was based at three sites in the City of London near St Paul's Cathedral, before moving to Pall Mall East (overlooking Trafalgar Square), and finally on to its current location in Regent's Park.

The first Harveian Librarian was Christopher Merret, a fellow of the college and a friend of Harvey. He was set up with a lifetime appointment that compensated him with room and board and a small stipend. In 1666, the Great fire of London destroyed many of the rooms and most of the books, so they tried to break the contract with Merret, but he fought them at the King's Court, claiming it was a lifetime appointment. He eventually lost the case, was expelled from the Fellowship, had to seek private lodgings and return the books he had rescued from the fire.  

Throughout its history the college has issued advice across the whole range of medical and health matters. College publications include the first ten editions of the London Pharmacopoeia (written in Latin, and used for regulating the composition of medicines from 1618 and, through the college's police the Censors, for enforcing the college's monopoly on medical science, then being challenged by the Society of Apothecaries), and the 'Nomenclature of Diseases' in 1869. The latter created the international standard for the classification of diseases which was to last until the World Health Organization's Manual of the international classification of diseases superseded it in the twentieth century.

The college became the licensing body for medical books in the late seventeenth century, and sought to set new standards in learning through its own system of examinations. The college's tradition of examining continues to this day and it is still perhaps how the college is best known to the general public.

The Royal College of Physicians celebrated its 500-year anniversary in 2018.

Membership and fellowship

Membership
The MRCP(UK) postnominal is used by doctors who have passed the examinations for the Diploma of Membership of the Royal Colleges of Physicians of the United Kingdom, which are held jointly by all of the UK Royal Colleges of Physicians. Holders of the MRCP(UK) may also become "Collegiate Members" of the London College (using the additional post-nominal MRCP(Lond)) and/or of the other two UK colleges. Affiliate membership of the Royal College of Physicians is a similar level of membership as collegiate membership, but is awarded to senior doctors without MRCP(UK). Both Collegiate Members and Affiliate Members may be considered for advancement to fellowship of the college.

The college also has associate, medical student, and foundation doctor levels of membership.

Fellowship

Fellows of the Royal College of Physicians (who use the post-nominal FRCP) are elected mostly from the general membership (collegiate or affiliate), but also occasionally from among the members of the more specialised faculties within the Royal Colleges of Physicians, e.g. Occupational Medicine (MFOM), Pharmaceutical Medicine (MFPM), and Forensic and Legal Medicine (MFLM), etc.
There are also fellows who are elected de jure (usually medical experts from other countries) and honoris causa (dignitaries, members of the Royal Family, etc.).

Licentiate
The diploma of Licentiate of the Royal College of Physicians (LRCP) is no longer awarded. The LRCP qualification used to be reserved for medical graduates, in practice mainly Bachelors of Medicine from Oxford and Cambridge, but in the mid-nineteenth century became part of a very popular initial qualification in medicine awarded together with the MRCS (Eng) by the Conjoint Board, which by the end of the twentieth century came to be largely taken by overseas graduates. From 1993 the LRCP was awarded together with the LRCS and LMSSA through the United Examining Board until this pathway to medical registration was abolished in 1999.

Library
The library aims to support the learning and information needs of the members, students, and staff of the college. The unique collections may also used for research by members of the public. An enquiry service provides information on the current role and functions of the RCP as well as its history. The library holds books on a range of subjects including@
 history of medicine
 genealogy
 health and social policy
 medical education

Rare book collections
The Royal College of Physicians has had a library collection since its foundation in 1518, although most of the original books were destroyed during the Great Fire of London in 1666. The rare books and special collections are diverse in coverage, reflecting the collecting habits of earlier fellows and the need to provide the broad educational base considered suitable for physicians. The rare books are normally available to the general public, by appointment, Monday to Friday 10 am - 5 pm.

Books and journals — new and old — display a continuum of change and development in the RCP's specialties, as well as in the medical profession. Highlights include:
 approximately 130 books printed before 1502, including some of the earliest printings of the classical medical texts by Greek, Roman and Arabic doctors
 books belonging to and annotated by the Elizabethan astrologer and occultist John Dee
 approximately 3,000 books, dated up to 1688, in the Dorchester collection, on a variety of subjects including architecture, science and travel
 over 4,500 tracts from the 17th to the 19th century covering a wide range of subjects, both medical and scientific
 the Evan Bedford collection, which includes almost every significant text in the history of cardiology up to 1970

Highlights of the 20th-century collection include:
 books relating to the history of the RCP's specialties
 biographies of fellows and prominent figures in medicine
 books relating to the formation of the National Health Service (NHS) and its continuing history
 books relating to the history of hospitals in the UK
 books relating to medical ethics and the status and role of the physician
 every item published by the RCP, including reports and pamphlets.

The book collections are displayed in regularly changing exhibitions.

In December 2020 the college’s Board of Trustees (BoT) discussed in detail the RCP’s financial position, which, like so many charities, had been impacted significantly by the COVID-19 pandemic. All aspects of RCP activity had come under review and a range of cost reduction and income generation options considered, including the possible sale of non-medical books from its collection. The BoT recognised that this had caused concern for some quarters of the membership and agreed to delay such a sale for the immediate future.

Museum collections

The museum collections at the Royal College of Physicians relate to the history of the college, and the history of the Physician's profession. They help to place the history and development of medicine and health care in its widest context. The collections include: portraits, silver, medical instruments, the Symons Collection, commemorative medals and anatomical tables.

The collection of c. 250 portraits provides a pictorial and sculptural record of presidents, Fellows and other physicians associated with it from its foundation in 1518 to the present day. It includes pieces by well-known artists, such as a bust of Baldwin Hamey Junior (1600–1676) by Edward Pierce and one of Richard Mead (1673–1754) by Louis François Roubiliac. There are portraits, such as that of Richard Hale (1670–1728) by Jonathan Richardson. In 1964 a volume on the Portraits of the college was published by Gordon Wolstenholme in which they were described by David Piper.

The silver collection has few pieces pre-dating the Great Fire of London (1666) because of a robbery during the previous year. Baldwin Hamey's inkstand bell and William Harvey's whalebone demonstration rod, tipped with silver, are two that survive. Many pieces of silver are used to this day for formal occasions in the college. Special objects include the President's staff of office, the caduceus and the silver-gilt College mace.

The college also owns six  17th-century anatomical tables, probably made by drying and mounting the actual blood vessels and nerves of the human body onto blocks of wood and then varnishing them. They would have been used as a teaching aid for teaching anatomy, because it was difficult to obtain cadavers for dissection.

The Symons Collection of medical instruments is displayed within the college building. It began as a collection of objects relating to self-care in Georgian times and expanded to include items that would have been used by physicians when treating patients, mostly in the eighteenth and nineteenth centuries.

The collections can be searched via an online catalogue and items on display are open to the general public Monday to Friday 9 am – 5 pm. The Royal College of Physicians is a member of the London Museums of Health & Medicine.

Archives
The archive collections date back to the foundation of the Royal College of Physicians in 1518 and include the original Royal charter granted by King Henry VIII. The activities of the college are preserved in official minutes and other institutional records dating from the 16th century to the present.

Over 200 collections of personal papers reflect the experiences of practitioners and patients over the last 500 years. These collections include items dating back to the 13th century which relate to the history of medicine and science in Europe.

In the 19th century, William Munk, a fellow with a keen interest in medical biography started collection information about all the physicians who had either been licensed by the College or became a member. After years of research the resulting biographies were compiled into 3 volumes which included everyone who was a member of, or licensed by the college up to 1825. These volumes, published between 1861 and 1878 were the start of a series, known as Munk's Roll after the original compiler. Later volumes focussed on fellows and the series is now online with regular updates ensuring there is a biography for every past fellow from 1518 to the present.

The archive continues to collect records that demonstrate the developing roles of physicians, including oral recordings of practitioners reflecting on their lives and careers. The collections can be searched via an online catalogue, and are available to the general public by appointment. The ‘Voices of medicine’ oral histories are available to listen to via the library catalogue.

Facility

The college is located in St. Andrews Place, which is at the north end of the road running up the east side of Regent's Park, Park Square East. The college's previous headquarters, on Pall Mall East/Trafalgar Square, is now Canada House, part of the Canadian high commission in London. The college had a number of other locations prior to Pall Mall East, in the City of London.

The current College building was designed by architect Sir Denys Lasdun, opening in 1964 and has since been recognised as a building of national importance: it is a Grade I listed building, one of a very select band of post-war buildings sharing this distinction. Lasdun's use of mosaic clad concrete was extremely influential on many later public buildings. An interesting feature of the building was a 'Moving Wall', weighing five tons (5080 kg) and capable of being hydraulically lifted ten feet (3050 mm) to unite or sub-divide a hall of sixty-two feet (18.9 m) width, which was the interior width of the building. The hydraulic equipment and the steel framework for the Moving Wall were produced by Merryweather & Sons Ltd of Greenwich, hydraulic engineers. Although better known for fire fighting equipment it was not the company's first installation of this kind.

Publications
The college publishes two peer-reviewed medical journals. Clinical Medicine and Future Healthcare Journal. In addition, it publishes regular reports, clinical guidelines, policy papers and online resources. Occupational and Environmental Medicine is the official journal of the Faculty of Occupational Medicine.

Faculties
The Royal College of Physicians hosts six training faculties: the Faculty of Forensic and Legal Medicine, the Faculty for Pharmaceutical Medicine, the Faculty of Occupational Medicine the Faculty of Public Health, the Faculty of Sport and Exercise Medicine and the Faculty of Physician Associates.

Forensic and Legal Medicine 
The Faculty of Forensic and Legal Medicine (FFLM) was established as a faculty of the RCP in 2006 to develop and maintain the highest possible standards of competence and professional integrity in forensic and legal medicine. The specialty covers professionals working in three related disciplines: forensic medical practitioners (forensic physicians, forensic nurses and paramedics, forensic pathologists, sexual assault examiners, and child physical and sexual assault examiners); medico-legal advisers; and medically qualified coroners. The FFLM holds a number of exams for professionals working in Forensic and Legal Medicine. It is recognised as the authoritative body for the purpose of consultation in matters of educational or public interest concerning forensic and legal medicine.

Pharmaceutical Medicine
The Faculty of Pharmaceutical Medicine (FPM) of the royal colleges of physicians of the UK (Edinburgh, Glasgow and London) aims to advance the science and practice of pharmaceutical medicine by working to develop and maintain competence, ethics and integrity and the highest professional standards in the specialty for the benefit of the public.

Occupational Medicine
The Faculty of Occupational Medicine was inaugurated as a specialist faculty of the RCP in 1978. The FOM is the professional and educational body for occupational medicine in the UK and seeks to ensure the highest standards in the practice of occupational medicine.

Public Health 
The Faculty of Public Health (FPH) is a joint faculty of the three royal colleges of physicians of the United Kingdom (London, Edinburgh and Glasgow). It is a membership organisation for nearly 4,000 public health professionals across the UK and around the world. Its role is to improve the health and wellbeing of local communities and national populations.

Sport and Exercise Medicine 
The Faculty of Sport and Exercise Medicine (FSEM) UK is the governing body for the specialty of sport and exercise medicine (SEM) in the UK. It is an intercollegiate faculty of the RCP and the Royal College of Surgeons of Edinburgh.

Physician Associates
The Faculty of Physician Associates was founded in 2015 with the collaboration of the RCP and the UK Association of Physician Associates (UKAPA). The Faculty is the professional membership body for physician associates in the UK, and sets standards for the education and training of physician associates, publishes the PA national curriculum and oversees the running of the PA national certification examinations. It oversees the PA managed voluntary register.

College lectures
The college holds an annual lecture, commonly referred to as the Lumleian Lectures, which were named in honour of Lord Lumley and established as part of the Lumleian Trust. The trust and lectures were established in 1582 by Richard Caldwell, a former president of the college. The subject matter of the lectures was initially in surgery, which was later changed to in medicine. The first lecture was given by Richard Forster, and the lectures continue to today.

Other annual lectures are the Croonian Lecture, the Goulstonian Lecture, the Bradshaw Lecture and the Milroy Lectures.

Once a year, traditionally on St Luke's Day (18th October), a Fellow is appointed to deliver the Harveian Oration to the assembled college in memory of William Harvey. The oration seeks to honour the founders and benefactors of the college and encourage a spirit of experimentation amongst the members.

Awards

The Bisset Hawkins Medal is a triennial award founded in 1899 in honour of Francis Bisset Hawkins, a fellow of the college, to recognise work done in the preceding ten years in advancing sanitary science or promoting public health. The Baly Medal is a biennial award, founded by a gift from Frederick Daniel Dyster (1809?–93) received in 1866, confirmed by deed 1930 – in memory of William Baly: £400 to provide a gold medal for the person deemed to have most distinguished himself in the science of physiology, especially during the previous two years.

See also
 Alcohol Health Alliance UK
 List of presidents of the Royal College of Physicians

References

Further reading

External links 

 
 Royal College of Physicians history of medicine website
 Notes on the Royal College of Physicians from the Scholarly Societies project (includes information on the journals of the society)

 
Grade I listed buildings in the London Borough of Camden
Medical associations based in the United Kingdom
Physicians
Physicians
1518 establishments in England
Denys Lasdun buildings
Grade I listed institutional headquarters
College of Physicians
Medical museums in London
Museums in the London Borough of Camden
Brutalist architecture in London
Learned societies of the United Kingdom
Health in the London Borough of Camden
Organisations based in the London Borough of Camden